Michael Schimpelsberger (born 12 February 1991) is an Austrian professional footballer.

External links
  
 

1991 births
Living people
Austrian footballers
Austrian expatriate footballers
FC Twente players
SK Rapid Wien players
FC Wacker Innsbruck (2002) players
SKN St. Pölten players
Austrian Football Bundesliga players
2. Liga (Austria) players
Eredivisie players
Expatriate footballers in the Netherlands
Austrian expatriate sportspeople in the Netherlands
Footballers from Linz
Austria youth international footballers
Austria under-21 international footballers
Association football defenders